Erik Beckman (23 April 1935 – 8 June 1995) was a Swedish poet, novelist and playwright. Among his poetry collections are Varifrån dom observeras from 1966, Kyss Er! from 1969, and  Kärleksgubbar! Herdedikter from 1981. He was awarded the Dobloug Prize in 1972.

References

1935 births
1995 deaths
Swedish male poets
20th-century Swedish novelists
20th-century Swedish poets
20th-century Swedish dramatists and playwrights
Swedish male novelists
Swedish male dramatists and playwrights
International Writing Program alumni
20th-century Swedish male writers